David Lee Grayson, Jr. (born February 27, 1964) is a former professional American football linebacker who played five seasons in the National Football League (NFL) for the Cleveland Browns and San Diego Chargers.  Grayson played college football at Fresno State and prepped at Lincoln High in Southeast San Diego.

Grayson's father, Dave Grayson,
played three years in the American Football League (AFL) with the Dallas Texans, the Kansas City Chiefs and the Oakland Raiders and then 6 years in the NFL after the two leagues merged.

References

1964 births
Living people
Players of American football from San Diego
American football linebackers
Fresno State Bulldogs football players
Cleveland Browns players
San Diego Chargers players
Cal Poly Pomona Broncos football players